Nelson Seymour Lougheed (April 16, 1882 – June 6, 1944) was a businessman and political figure in British Columbia. He represented Dewdney in the Legislative Assembly of British Columbia from 1928 to 1933 as a Conservative.

He was born in Thornbury, Ontario in 1882 and came to British Columbia with his family in 1889. In 1905, Lougheed moved to Port Haney where he operated a sawmill in partnership with G.G. Abernethy. He was also active in mining and logging. Lougheed was mayor of Maple Ridge. He served in the provincial cabinet as Minister of Public Works from 1928 to 1929 and as Minister of Lands from 1930 to 1933. Lougheed died in Vancouver at the age of 62 in 1944.

The Lougheed Highway was named after him.

References 

1882 births
1944 deaths
People from The Blue Mountains, Ontario
Mayors of places in British Columbia
British Columbia Conservative Party MLAs